Chuikov or Chuykov is a Russian masculine surname, its feminine counterpart is Chuikova or Chuykova. It may refer to
Evgeniy Chuikov (1924–2000), Ukrainian landscape painter
Sergey Chuykov (born 1980), Azerbaijani futsal player
Vasily Chuikov (1900–1982), Soviet military leader

Russian-language surnames